Henry Taefu (born 2 April 1993) is a Samoan rugby union centre who has signed with Moana Pasifika for the 2022 Super Rugby Pacific season, having previously played for the Western Force in Australia’s Super Rugby AU.

Early / provincial career

Taefu was born in Apia, the capital city of Samoa, but moved to New Zealand with his family at age 9, then to Brisbane in Australia aged 12. He attended school at the famed Anglican Church Grammar School in Brisbane and upon graduation joined the Parramatta Eels, a rugby league club based in the suburbs of Sydney. However, in 2012 he moved back to Queensland and joined Queensland Premier Rugby side Sunnybank. He helped the Dragons reach the grand final of the competition in 2014 and was the team's 5th highest point scorer in 2015. His form at this level earned selection for the  ahead of the inaugural National Rugby Championship in 2014. He was on the move again in 2015, heading back north to Brisbane to join .

Super Rugby career

Taefu’s performances over 2 seasons in the National Rugby Championship saw Super Rugby franchise, the Queensland Reds, come calling in 2016. On 17 October 2021, it was announced that Henry signed with the new Super Rugby franchise, Moana Pasifika

International

Taefu was selected as a member of the Australia Under-20 squad which competed in the 2013 IRB Junior World Championship in France. He played 2 matches before succumbing to a shoulder injury which required surgery that in turn uncovered an undiagnosed adrenal gland tumour. He has played for the Manu Samoa since 2017 and played in their 2019 Rugby World Cup Squad. He scored all 19 points in the third pool game against Japan. In 2021, he started both 2023 World Cup Qualifiers against Tonga.

Super Rugby statistics

References

External links 
 

1993 births
Living people
Australian rugby union players
Rugby union centres
Greater Sydney Rams players
Brisbane City (rugby union) players
Queensland Reds players
Samoan emigrants to Australia
People educated at Anglican Church Grammar School
Sportspeople from Apia
Samoa international rugby union players
Moana Pasifika players
Samoan rugby union players
US Colomiers players
Western Force players
North Harbour rugby union players